In mathematics, in the area of potential theory, a pluripolar set is the analog of a polar set for plurisubharmonic functions.

Definition
Let  and let  be a plurisubharmonic function which is not identically . The set 

 

is called a complete pluripolar set. A pluripolar set is any subset of a complete pluripolar set. Pluripolar sets are of Hausdorff dimension at most  and have zero Lebesgue measure.

If  is a holomorphic function then  is a plurisubharmonic function.

See also 
Skoda-El Mir theorem

References

Steven G. Krantz. Function Theory of Several Complex Variables, AMS Chelsea Publishing, Providence, Rhode Island, 1992. 

Potential theory